China State Railway Group Company, Ltd., doing business as China Railway (CR), is the national passenger and freight railroad corporation of the People's Republic of China. 

China Railway operates passenger and freight transport throughout China with 18 regional subsidiaries. By September 2022, the total assets of China Railway Group are CNY 9.06 trillion (USD 1.24 trillion).

History 
Under the Chinese Corporate Law, China Railway Corporation was reorganized into China State Railway Group Co., Ltd. on June 18, 2019, instead of Industrial Enterprises Owned by the Whole People. This meant the Ministry of Finance would act as an investor on behalf of the state and the company would be led by a board and managed by board-chosen executives.

Logo 

The China Railway logo was designed by Chen Yuchang (1912–1969), officially adopted on 22 January 1950. The whole logo represents the front of a locomotive. The upper part of the logo represents the Chinese character 人 (people), while the lower part represents the transversal surface of a rail. The logo means that China's railway belongs to the people. The lower part represents the character 工 (labour), means that China's railway belongs to the working class.

The "CR" logo is used on the Fuxing (train) along with the China Railway logo.

Companies 

There are 21 primary subsidiary companies under China Railway. As of 2008, approximately two million people work in China Railway.

Second tier subsidiaries

International operations

International trains
China Railway operates passenger trains from China to Mongolia, Russia, Kazakhstan, North Korea, and Vietnam. Also operates freight (cargo) trains to these countries plus Laos. Currently all international passenger trains are suspended due to the COVID-19 pandemic in Asia.

Before COVID break outs, there were 11 international passenger train services:
 95/8, Dandong–Pyongyang
 401/2, Suifenhe–Grodekovo
 K3/4, Beijing–Ulaanbaatar–Moscow
 K19/20, Beijing–(Manzhouli)–Moscow
 K23/4, Beijing–Ulaanbaatar
 K27/8, Beijing–Pyongyang
 K4651/2/3/4, Hohhot–Ulaanbaatar
 K9795/6, Ürümqi–Almaty
 K9797/8, Ürümqi–Nur-Sultan
 Z5/6–T8701/2, Beijing West–Nanning (transfer station)–Gia Lâm (Hanoi)

Services to Europe (New Silk Route)

 
 China Railway ran goods services to 15 European cities, including routes to Madrid and Hamburg and the experimental  East Wind service to London to test demand. The Chinese government refers to the two-week  route, starting at Yiwu and with trains to London traversing Kazakhstan, Russia, Belarus, Poland, Germany, Belgium and France, as the Belt and Road Initiative. Containers must be transferred several times, as different, incompatible, rail gauges are used in different regions, and the same rolling stock cannot be used throughout.

Africa

China has been investing in and helping to rebuild railways in Africa. Below is an incomplete list of rail projects.

List of directors general
Sheng Guangzu (2013–2016)
Lu Dongfu (2016–2018)
Yang Yudong (2018–)

Footnotes

See also 

 Rail transport in China
 List of locomotives in China
 China Railway High-speed
 MTR
 Passenger rail transport in China
 High-speed rail in China

References

External links 
  The official ticketing website for China Railway－12306.cn
  China Railway Corporation official website

Railway companies of China
Companies based in Beijing
Chinese companies established in 2013
Railway companies established in 2013
Chinese brands
 
Government-owned companies of China
Government-owned railway companies